Södra vattentornet is a water tower in Örebro that was built in 1886 and ended in 1958 along with Norra Vattentornet. It was replaced by Svampen.

References

Buildings and structures in Örebro
Water towers in Sweden
Buildings and structures completed in 1886
1886 establishments in Sweden
1958 disestablishments in Sweden